Catholicon is a 15th-century dictionary written in Breton, French, and Latin. It is the first Breton dictionary and also the first French dictionary. It contains six thousand entries and was compiled in 1464 by the Breton priest Jehan Lagadeuc. It was printed in 1499 in Tréguier. A manuscript of the dictionary is preserved in the national library in Paris, identified as Latin 7656.

The  is also to be distinguished from the Catholicon of John of Genoa, a dictionary dated late 13th century written in Italy.

Bibliography 
 Le Catholicon, reproduction of Jehan Calvez's edition (5 November 1499) from a copy at Rennes, edited by Christian-J. Guyonvarc'h, Éditions Ogam, Rennes, 1975
–do. –New edition issued by éditions Armeline, Brest, 2005

 Le vocabulaire breton du Catholicon (1499), le premier dictionnaire breton imprimé breton-français-latin de Jehan Lagadeuc, edited by Gwennole Le Menn, (Bibliothèque bretonne; 11.) Imprimerie Keltia Graphic, Edition Skol (Spézet), 2001

External  links 
 Facsimile edition of the Catholicon

Breton language
Breton dictionaries
French dictionaries
Latin dictionaries
Multilingual dictionaries
15th-century Latin books